The Independent Telecommunications Providers Association (formerly Ontario Telecommunications Association) is a non-profit organization which represents the telecommunications industry incumbent local exchange carriers in the Canadian provinces of Ontario, British Columbia, and Quebec.

See also
 International Telecommunication Union
 Inter-American Telecommunication Commission (CITEL)
 List of telecommunications regulatory bodies

References

External links
 Independent Telecommunications Providers Association

Non-profit organizations based in Ontario
Telecommunications in Canada
Telecommunications organizations
Communications in British Columbia
Communications in Ontario

Communications in Quebec
Trade associations based in Ontario
Trade associations based in British Columbia
Trade associations based in Quebec